Ali Mohammed El-Kaf El-Sayed (15 June 1906 - 1979) was an Egyptian football defender who played for Egypt in the 1934 FIFA World Cup. He also played for Zamalek SC, and represented Egypt at the 1936 Summer Olympics.

International career
He represented Egypt in the 1934 FIFA World Cup and 1936 Summer Olympics.

Honors
Tersana
Sultan Hussein Cup: (1)
 1930
Zamalek
Egypt Cup: (3)
 1932, 1935, 1938
Cairo League: (1)
 1931–32

References

1906 births
Year of death missing
People from Beni Suef Governorate
Egyptian footballers
Egypt international footballers
Association football defenders
Tersana SC players
Zamalek SC players
1934 FIFA World Cup players
Olympic footballers of Egypt
Footballers at the 1936 Summer Olympics